This is a list of archives, museums and art galleries in Richmond upon Thames.

Archives
 The National Archives

Museums
 Eel Pie Island Museum
 Garrick's Temple to Shakespeare
 The Hearsum Collection
 Langdon Down Museum of Learning Disability
 Museum No.1, Kew Gardens
 Museum of Army Music
 Museum of Richmond
 Twickenham Museum
 World Rugby Museum

Art galleries at Kew Gardens
 Marianne North Gallery
 Shirley Sherwood Gallery

Other art galleries
 Orleans House Gallery
 Riverside Gallery

Art collections at Hampton Court Palace
The Calling of Saints Peter and Andrew
 Hampton Court Beauties
 The Story of Abraham
 Triumphs of Caesar
 Windsor Beauties
 Other works of art at Hampton Court Palace

 
Art galleries in London
London Borough of Richmond upon Thames
London-related lists
Museums in the London Borough of Richmond upon Thames